The Capture of Olovo (1 November — 17 December 1941) was a battle fought between allied forces of Chetnik Detachments of the Yugoslav Army (Chetniks) and Yugoslav Partisans against the Axis forces of Independent State of Croatia garrisoned in Olovo in the first year of the World War II in Yugoslavia.

Background 
On 21 September 1941 Chetniks attacked militia guards who protected a wooden bridge on the railway between Olovo and Kladanj. They killed one and imprisoned 9 militiamen, without damaging the bridge. On 29 September Chetniks burned wooden bridge between Olovo and Zavidovići.

On 28 October parts of Partisan Romanija Detachment in cooperation with Chetniks captured village Knežina after three days of fighting. Croatian Home Guard and Muslim militiamen fled Knežina and retreated to Olovo.

On 14 November 1941 Captain Sreharski Janko was appointed as commander of Olovo garrison. The 4th company of Sarajevo Reserve Battalion was commanded by Lieutenant Ante Marinković.

Forces 
Four Chetnik companies with 400 Chetniks and parts of Partisan Romanija Detachment (Knežina, Bjelogoračka and Crepoljska companies) and Zvijezda Detachment (Nišić battalion and Crnovrška and Vlahinjska company) with total of 800 Partisans organized an unsuccessful attack on Olovo on 1 November 1941.

The Axis forces in Olovo belonged to the III Domobran Corps commanded by Mihajlo Lukić. In mid-December 1941 the garrison in Olovo consisted of 2 companies of Croatian Home Guard, 180 militiamen, 40 gendarmes and a battery of mountain guns. The North-East positions around Olovo were defended by the 4th company of Sarajevo Reserve Battalion (166 members of Croatian Home Guards) enforced by 1 machine-gun. The South-East positions were held by the 17th company of the 6th Infantry Regiment (70 members of Croatian Home Guards, without one platoon). The West positions were defended by militia consisting of 130 and 40 militiamen. A battery of two mountain-guns operated from positions west of railway station in Olovo. One platoon of the 17th company of 6th Infantry Regiment was kept as reserve while flanks were protected by 50 militiamen in village Ponijerka.

Offensive

Artillery preparation 
According to some contemporary Croatian reports, in period 1–24 November 1941 about 240 Chetniks were killed during their attacks on Axis controlled Olovo. On 17 November in 7 a.m. insurgents attacked Olovo garrison. The attack started by Chetnik artillery which destroyed militia guard post killing and wounding 24 militiamen, while remaining 6 of them fled. The Chetnik artillery was then aimed against the most important position of Olovo garrison, so called "Stijena" which was defended by the 4th company of Sarajevo Reserve Battalion supported by one machine gun. The position of machine gun was quickly destroyed by Chetnik artillery. Another machine gun was sent as a replacement, but it was also quickly destroyed by Chetnik artillery.

Infantry assault and capture of Olovo 
Around 10 a.m. the insurgents stopped their artillery fire and replaced it with barrages of rifle fire of the infantry insurgent units. The commander of the 4th company of Sarajevo Reserve Battalion, Ante Marinković was wounded during this attack and his company had to retreat from "Stijena" in 12:30. After being inforced by one reserve platoon this company managed to recapture "Stijena" for short time only to retreat after being attacked by more numerous Chetnik forces. When Chetniks permanently captured "Stijena" they burned straws as signal to other insurgents about their success. This boosted morale of the insurgents to attack more fiercely the positions of Olovo garrison that began retreating from their positions. To avoid capture of his forces, garrison commander Streharski retreat to the positions west of the village Solun. On 17 December 1941 Olovo was recaptured by Chetnik and Partisan rebel units.

On 18 December Streharski continued his retreat under fire until his forces reached Careva Ćuprija.

Aftermath 
At the end of 1941 joint Partisan-Chetnik administration still existed in many Eastern Bosnian towns, including Olovo.

The post-war Yugoslav sources emphasize that on 21 January 1942 part of German 750 regiment from 718 Infantry Division recaptured Olovo after the weak resistance of Chetniks. In 1943 Partisan 2nd Serbian brigade recaptured Olovo and burned its railway station and its wagons and equipment.

References

Sources 

 
 

Olovo
Olovo
Olovo
Olovo Municipality